The Lima Buckeyes were a very short-lived Central League baseball team, based in Lima, Ohio. Their existence consisted of only eight games in 1934, each of which they lost. Their manager was Jess Orndorff. They disbanded on May 26 of that season.

Only one known major league baseball player ever played for them - Herb Thomas.

References

Baseball teams established in 1934
Defunct minor league baseball teams
Baseball teams disestablished in 1934
1934 establishments in Ohio
1934 disestablishments in Ohio
Defunct baseball teams in Ohio
Central League teams